Wiggy may refer to:

Nickname:
 Wayne Dover (born 1973), Guyanese football player and manager
 Tim Selwood (born 1944), English retired cricketer
 Ty Wigginton (born 1977), American former Major League Baseball player

Entertainment:
 a regular sketch in the 1990s UK comedy series Canned Carrott
 the stage name of the Shaggy Man's brother, a character in L. Frank Baum's Oz books
 a character in the American animated TV series The Pebbles and Bamm-Bamm Show

Other uses:
 a registered trademark for a common solenoid voltmeter used in North America

See also
 "Da Wiggy", a song by Heltah Skeltah from their 1996 album Nocturnal
 "Wiggy Wiggy", a song by SPM from his 1999 album The 3rd Wish: To Rock the World

Lists of people by nickname Like My Tiktok @zayumn